Stock pot is a generic name for one of the most common types of cooking pot used worldwide. A stock pot is traditionally used to make stock or broth, which can be the basis for cooking more complex recipes. It is a wide pot with a flat bottom, straight sides, a wide opening to the full diameter of the pot, two handles on the sides, and a lid with a handle on top.

Applications
On the first page of his publication “A Guide to Modern Cookery” (1907), French Chef Auguste Escoffier states that "stocks are the keynote of culinary structure" in French cuisine. A stock or broth is made by simmering water for several hours, to continuously cook added foods such as pieces of meat, meat bones, fish, or vegetables. The slow simmering process transfers flavors, colors, and nutrients to the water, where they blend, and a new ingredient is thus created, the broth or stock.

A broth made with meat or meat bones creates a base with concentrated flavors and aromas, even without the addition of salt or herbs or spices. This is what is referred to as a soup base. Stock pots are also used for cooking stews, porridge, boiled foods, steamed shellfish, and many other types of recipes.

Stock pots have great versatility, and so they are used for many cooking purposes, and occasionally non-cooking purposes. For example, large stock pots are often used at home to boil clothing, wool, or yarn for color dying. They do not necessarily come in standard sizes. Manufacturers label pot sizes usually by volume (e.g., "12 liters") or sometimes by diameter (e.g., "28 cm").

The most common materials for manufacturing stock pots are stainless steel, aluminum, copper, and enamel (Vitreous enamel) on metal. More expensive types of stock pots have bottoms that are made of layers of different metals, to enhance heat conductivity.

See also
Bouillon
Broth
Cookware and bakeware
Kitchenware
Stock (food)

References

Kitchenware
Cooking vessels
Food preparation